Llafur (Labour in Welsh) – the full name of which is Llafur: The Welsh People's History Society – was founded in 1970 as Llafur: The Society for the Study of Welsh Labour History to promote the study of the history of the working people of Wales. Its main activities are the publication of the journal Llafur and a number of individual books. The Society also organises regular day schools and events to engage a wider audience with Welsh People's History.

Llafur has several stated aims.

Our aims include the following:
 bringing together those interested in the history of the working class and its organisations, unions, co-operative societies or political bodies
 publishing an annual journal - Llafur
 promoting people's history by working with other groups and organisations
 encouraging, helping, organising and developing such interest throughout the labour movement in Wales

Llafur: The Journal of the Society for the Study of Welsh Labour History is published in annual parts (four parts to a volume) from 1972 and contains scholarly articles and book reviews relating to labour and people's history. The journal is included in the Welsh Journals Online project at the National Library of Wales.

Ieuan Gwynedd Jones was one of the founders of the society and its president until 2018.

External links
Llafur website

References

1970 establishments in Wales
History magazines published in the United Kingdom
History of Wales
Welsh-language magazines
Magazines published in Wales
Magazines established in 1970